American-born Swiss pop/rock singer Tina Turner has been nominated for, and won, numerous worldwide awards and accolades.

American Music Awards
Created by Dick Clark in 1973, the American Music Awards is an annual music awards ceremony and one of several major annual American music awards shows. Turner won 3 AMAs from eight nominations.

|-
| rowspan="5"|1985
| rowspan="5"|Herself
| Favorite Soul/R&B Female Artist
| 
|-
| Favorite Soul/R&B Female Video Artist
| 
|-
| Favorite Pop/Rock Female Video Artist
| 
|-
| Favorite Soul/R&B Single for "What's Love Got To Do With It"
| 
|-
| Favorite Pop/Rock Single for "What's Love Got To Do With It"
| 
|-
| 1986
| Herself
| Favorite Pop/Rock Female Artist
| 
|-
| rowspan="2"| 1987
| rowspan="2"| Herself
| Favorite Pop/Rock Female Video Artist
| 
|-
| Favorite Soul/R&B Female Video Artist
| 
|-

Billboard Year-End Charts Awards

|-
| rowspan="6"|1984
| rowspan="4"|Herself
|Comeback of the Year
| 
|-
|Artist of the Year
|
|-
|Female Vocalist of the Year
|
|-
|Soul/R&B Artist of the Year
|
|-
|What's Love Got to Do with It
| Song of the Year
|
|-
|Private Dancer
| Album of the Year
|
|-

| 1986
| Herself
| Singer of the Year
| 
|-
|-
| 1993
| Herself
| Chart Achievement Award
| 
|-

Cyprus Music Awards
Tina Turner won one Cyprus Music Award from 2 nominations.

|-
| 2011
| Herself
| Best Artists from the Oldies
| 
|-
| 2012
| Herself
| Best Artists from the Oldies
| 
|-

Essence Awards
Ann-Margret presented the Essence Award to Turner on stage.

Grammy Awards
The Grammy Awards are awarded annually by the National Academy of Recording Arts and Sciences of the United States. Turner has won 8 Grammys from 25 nominations. She has also received 3 Grammy Hall of Fame Awards and a Grammy Lifetime Achievement Award, giving her a total of 12 Grammys.

|-
| 1962
| It's Gonna Work Out Fine
| 
| 
|-
| 1970
| The Hunter
| 
| 
|-
| 1972
| Proud Mary (Shared with Ike Turner)
| 
| 
|-
| rowspan="2"|1975
| Tina Turns the Country On!
| 
| 
|-
| The Gospel According To Ike And Tina
| 
| 
|-
| rowspan="5"| 1985
| Private Dancer
| 
| 
|-
| rowspan="2"| What's Love Got to Do with It
| 
| 
|-
| 
| 
|-
| Better Be Good to Me
| 
| 
|-
| Let's Stay Together
| 
| 
|-
| rowspan="5"| 1986
| Private Dancer
| 
| 
|-
| One of the Living
| 
| 
|-
| We Don't Need Another Hero
| 
| 
|-
| It's Only Love
| .
| 
|-
| Tina Live
| 
| 
|-
| rowspan="2"| 1987
| Back Where You Started
| 
| 
|-
| Typical Male
| 
| 
|-
| 1988
| Better Be Good To Me live
| 
| 
|-
| 1989
| Tina Live in Europe
| 
| 
|-
| 1990
| Foreign Affair
| 
| 
|-
| 1991
| Steamy Windows
| 
| 
|-
| 1993
| The Bitch Is Back
| 
| 
|-
| 1994
| I Don't Wanna Fight
| 
| 
|-
| 1998
| Live in Amsterdam: Wildest Dreams Tour
| 
| 
|-
| 2008
| River: The Joni Letters (Shared with Various Artists)
| 
| 

Note: "What's Love Got to Do with It also won the Grammy for "Song of the Year". This award was presented to songwriters Terry Britten and Graham Lyle. Note: Tina is also represented in the Grammy Hall of Fame with three of her singles inducted: "River Deep - Mountain High" (1999); "Proud Mary" (2003); and "What's Love Got To Do With It" (2012).

Grammy Hall of Fame

Grammy Special awards

Guinness Book of World Records

In January 1988 Turner set a Guinness World Record "for the largest paying rock concert attendance for a solo artist" by performing in front of approximately  people at Maracanã Stadium in Rio de Janeiro, Brazil, which remained until 1997. Some sources claim that she's also listed in the Guinness Book of Records for selling more concert tickets than any solo performer in history.

Guinness Book of British Hit Singles & Albums
British Hit Singles & Albums (originally known as The Guinness Book of British Hit Singles and The Guinness Book of British Hit Albums) is a music reference book originally published in the United Kingdom by the publishing arm of Guinness, Guinness Superlatives. Turner has been featured three times.

!
|-
|| 2002
|| Turner
| Top 100 Artists of All Time – #67
| 
| style="text-align:center;"|
|-
|| 2005
|| Turner
| Top 100 Most Successful Acts Of All Time in The Book Of British Hit Singles & Albums.#34
| 
| style="text-align:center;"|
|-
|| 2010
| Turner
| the first recording artist in UK chart history to score top 40 hits in the
1960s,1970s,1980s,1990s,2000s and 2010s.
| 
| style="text-align:center;"|

|-
|| 2020
| Turner
| the first recording artist in UK chart history to score top 40 hits in the
1960s,1970s,1980s,1990s,2000s,2010s and 2020s.
| 
| style="text-align:center;"|

|-

Hollywood Walk of Fame
These are the awards Tina Turner only won. The awards she didn't are not included.

|-
| 1986
| Herself
| Recipient
| 
|-

IFPI Platinum Europe Awards
The IFPI Platinum Europe Awards were founded in 1996 and are awarded in recognition of one million album retail sales across Europe. Turner has received 3 awards.

|-
| style="text-align:center;"| 1997
| Wildest Dreams (2x)
| rowspan="7"|Platinum Europe Award
| 
|-
| style="text-align:center;"| 1999
| Twenty Four Seven (1x)
| 
|-
| style="text-align:center;"| 2004
| All the Best (1x)
| 
|-

Kennedy Center Honors

|-
| 2005
| Herself
| Award
| 
|-

Live Design
The concerts received additional accolades, receiving an "Excellence Award" from Live Design Magazine.

|-
| 2009
| Tina!: 50th Anniversary Tour
| Excellence Award
| 
|-

MTV Video Music Awards
he MTV Video Music Awards were established in 1984 by MTV to celebrate the top music videos of the year. Turner won two VMAs out of five nominations.

|-
| rowspan="3"| 
| "What's Love Got to Do with It"
| Best Female Video
| 
|-
| "Better Be Good to Me"
| Best Stage Performance in a Video
| 
|-
| "Private Dancer"
| Best Choreography
| 
|-
| rowspan="2"| 
| "It's Only Love" (with Bryan Adams)
| Best Stage Performance in a Video
| 
|-
| "We Don't Need Another Hero"
| Best Female Video
| 
|-

NAACP Image Awards
These are the awards Tina Turner only won. The awards she didn't are not included.

|-
|1986
|Herself
|Outstanding Female Actress
|
|-
|1998
|Herself
|Outstanding Performance in a Variety Series/Special
|
|-

Pollstar Awards
The Pollstar Concert Industry Awards aim to reward the best in the business of shows and concerts. Turner has received 5 awards.

!
|-
| rowspan="2"| 1984
| rowspan="2"| 1984 World Tour
| Best National Tour Package
| 
|style="text-align:center;" rowspan="2"|
|-
| Comeback of the Year
| 
|-
| rowspan="3"| 1985
| rowspan="3"|Private Dancer Tour
| Most Creative Tour Package
| 
|style="text-align:center;" rowspan="3"|
|-
| Comeback Tour Of The Year
| 
|-
| Most Creative Stage Set
| 
|-
| rowspan="2"| 2000
| rowspan="2"| Twenty Four Seven Tour
| Road Warrior of the Year
| 
|style="text-align:center;" rowspan="2"|
|-
| Major Tour of the Year
| 
|-

Rock & Roll Hall of Fame
These are the awards Tina Turner only won. The awards she did not are not included.

|-
| 1991
| Herself*
| Recipient
| 
|-
| 2021
| Herself
| Recipient
| 

Inducted to the Hall alongside former husband Ike Turner in 1991.

Tony Awards
The Tony Award recognizes excellence in live Broadway theatre. Tina Turner has received one nomination.

|-
| 2020
| Tina: The Tina Turner Musical
| Best Musical
|

World Music Awards
These are the awards Tina Turner only won. The awards she didn't are not included.

|-
| 1991
| Herself
|Outstanding Contribution to Music
| 
|-
| 1993
| Herself
| The Legend Award
| 
|-

Museum Awards
Tina Turner Museum received 9 awards at the Tennessee Association of Museums Conference, the Discovery Park of America in Union City.

|-
| 2015
| Herself
| Past President's Award
| 
|-
| 2015
| Herself
| Special Recognition Tina Turner
| 
|-
| 2015
| Herself
| Permanent Exhibition Tina Turner Museum at Flagg Grove School
| 
|-
| 2015
| Herself
| Special Event "Grand Opening of Tina Turner Museum at Flagg Grove School
| 
|-
| 2015
| Herself
| Volunteerism Sandra and Fred Silverstein
| 
|-
| 2015
| Herself
| Special Recognition Ann and Pat Mann
| 
|-
| 2015
| Herself
| Publication: Book/Catalog Life Perspectives 7 Award Winning West TN Artists
| 
|-
| 2015
| Herself
| Superlative Achievement for Publications: PR Kit PLA Media-Tina Turner Museum at Flagg Grove School
| 
|-
| 2015
| Herself
| Publications: Flat Paper The Art of Farming brochure
|

Record World Awards
Record World magazine (1946–1982) was one of the three main music industry trade magazines in the United States, along with Billboard and Cash Box magazines, The Record World Awards were an annual award given to most successful artists in the US.

!
|-
| rowspan="1"| 1969
| Ike & Tina Turner
| Top Promising Duo Albums Of The Year
| 
|style="text-align:center;" rowspan="1"|
|-
| rowspan="2"| 1971
| Ike & Tina Turner
| Top Duo (Albums)
| 
|style="text-align:center;" rowspan="2"|
|-
| Ike & Tina Turner
| Top Duo (Singles)
| 
|-
| 1972
| Ike & Tina Turner
| Top Duo R&B Award
| 
|style="text-align:center;" rowspan="1"|
|-
| 1973
| Ike & Tina Turner
| Top Duo R&B Of The Year
| 
|style="text-align:center;" rowspan="1"|
|-
| rowspan="2"|1974
| rowspan="2 |Ike & Tina Turner
| Top Duo Of The Year (Album)
| 
|style="text-align:center;" rowspan="2"|
|-
|Top Vocal Duo Of The Year (Singles)
|
|-

Record Mirror R&B Poll
R&B POLL RESULTS – Week ending April 25, 1964

!
|-
| 1964
| Tina Turner
| TOP FEMALE SINGER
| 
|style="text-align:center;" rowspan="1"|
|-

Record World DJ Awards

!
|-
| 1971
| Ike & Tina Turner
| TOP Duo Of The Year (singles)
| 
|style="text-align:center;" rowspan="1"|
|-

Roper Poll

!
|-
| 1985
| rowspan="2"| Tina Turner
| America's Heroes and Heroines of the Year
| 
|style="text-align:center;" rowspan="1"|
|-
| 1999
| the most admired women of the 20th Century
| 
|style="text-align:center;" rowspan="1"|
|-

Rolling Stone Critics Poll Music Awards
Turner has won 5 times list.

!
|-
| rowspan="5"| 1984
| Private Dancer - Tina Turner
| Albums Of The Year
| 
|style="text-align:center;" rowspan="2"|
|-
| What's Love Got To Do With It - Tina Turner
| Top Best Singles of 1984
| 
|-
| Tina Turner
| Top Best Female vocalists
| 
|style="text-align:center;" rowspan="1"|
|-
| Tina Turner
| The Artist Of The Year
| 
|style="text-align:center;" rowspan="2"|
|-
| Tina Turner
| Soul / R&B artist Of The Year
| 
|-

Rolling Stone's Readers Poll Awards
1986 – Rolling Stone Music Awards Readers´ Poll gave Tina Awards for Best Female Singer Of The Year and Comeback Of The Year.

!
|-
| rowspan="2"|1984
| Tina Turner
| Top Best Female vocalists
| 
|style="text-align:center;" rowspan="1"|
|-
| Tina Turner
| R&B Artist Of The Year
| 
|style="text-align:center;" rowspan="1"|
|-
| rowspan="2"| 1986
| Tina Turner
| Best Female Singer Of The Year
| 
|style="text-align:center;" rowspan="2"|
|-
| Tina Turner
| Comeback Of The Year
| 
|-

Smash Hits Awards
Smash Hits was a pop music magazine, aimed at teenagers and young adults and originally published in the United Kingdom by EMAP. It ran from 1978 to 2006.

!
|-
| rowspan="1"| 1984
| Tina Turner
| Best Female Singer Of The Year
| 
|style="text-align:center;" rowspan="1"|
|-
| rowspan="1"| 1985
| Tina Turner
| Best Female Singer Of The Year
| 
|style="text-align:center;" rowspan="1"|
|-
| rowspan="1"| 1986
| Tina Turner
| Best Female Singer Of The Year
| 
|style="text-align:center;" rowspan="1"|
|-
| 1987
| Tina Turner
| Best Female Singer Of The Year
| 
|style="text-align:center;" rowspan="1"|
|-
| 1990
| Tina Turner
| Best Female Singer Of The Year
| 
|style="text-align:center;" rowspan="1"|
|-
| 1991
| Tina Turner
| Best Female Singer Of The Year
| 
|style="text-align:center;" rowspan="1"|
|-
| 1993
| Tina Turner
| Best Female Singer Of The Year
| 
|style="text-align:center;" rowspan="1"|
|-

U.S. Television Viewers Awards

Other awards
AARP Awards
{| class="wikitable" width="100%"
|-
! width="17%"| Year
! width="17%"| Nominee/Work
! width="30%"| Award
! width="10%"| Result
! width="5%"| Ref
|-
| 1999
| rowspan="2"| "Tina Turner"
| rowspan="2"| The Sexiest Stars Award
| 
| style="text-align:center;" rowspan="2" |
|-

Austin Music Awards

!
|-
|1985-1986
|Tina Turner
| Best Concert By a Touring Artist
|
|style="text-align:center;" rowspan="1" |
|-
|1987-1988
|Tina Turner
| Best Concert By a Touring Artist
| 
|style="text-align:center;" rowspan="1" |
|-
| rowspan="2"| 2000-2001
| Tina Turner
| Best Roadshow of the Year
| 
|style="text-align:center;" rowspan="1" |
|-
| Tina Turner
| Best Concert By a Touring Artist
| 
|style="text-align:center;" rowspan="1" |
|-

Bravo Awards
A German accolade honoring excellence of performers in film, television and music. Presented annually since 1957, winners are selected by the readers of Bravo magazine. The award is presented in Gold, Silver and Bronze.

!
|-
| 1984
| Herself
| Favorite Female Singer of the Year - (Bronze Award)
| 
|style="text-align:center;" rowspan="1"|
|-
| 1985
| Herself
| Favorite Female Singer of the Year - (Bronze Award)
| 
|style="text-align:center;" rowspan="1"|
|-

French Jazz Academy Soul Awards
Jazz music has been popular in France since the 1920s. Its international popularity peaked in the 1930s, and it has been continually enjoyed since. Ike and Tina Turner received the French Jazz Academy Soul award during their late January visit to Paris.

!
|-
|rowspan="2"|1971
|"Ike and Tina Turner"
| Top Duo of the Year
|
|style="text-align:center;" rowspan="1" |
|-

MOBO Awards
The MOBO Awards (an acronym for "Music of Black Origin") were established in 1996 by Kanya King. They are held annually in the United Kingdom to recognize artists of any race or nationality performing music of black origin. Turner has received Mobo Awards from Lionel Richie

|-
| 1999
| Herself
| Lifetime Achievement Award
| 
|-

The CASH BOX Year-End Charts
Cash Box magazine awards was a weekly publication devoted to the music and coin-operated machine industries which was published from July 1942 to November 16, 1996. It was one of several magazines that published charts of song popularity in the United States. Turner, both solo and with Ike, has been listed on the award lists 12 times.

!
|-
|| 1960
| A FOOL IN LOVE - Ike & Tina Turner
| Top 50 R&B singles–
|
| style="text-align:center;"|
|-
| rowspan="2"| 1961
| It's Gonna Work Out Fine - Ike & Tina Turner
| Top 50 R&B singles–
|
|style="text-align:center;" rowspan="2"|
|-
| I IDOLIZE YOU – Ike & Tina Turner
| Top 50 R&B singles–
|
|-
|| 1962
| POOR FOOL – Ike & Tina Turner
| Top 50 R&B singles–
|
| style="text-align:center;"|
|-
|| 1971
| PROUD MARY – Ike & Tina Turner
| TOP 100 POP SINGLES –
|
| style="text-align:center;"|
|-
| rowspan="3"| 1984
||WHAT’S LOVE GOT TO DO WITH IT  Tina Turner
| TOP 100 POP SINGLES –
|
|style="text-align:center;" rowspan="2"|
|-
|BETTER BE GOOD TO ME – Tina Turner
| TOP 100 POP SINGLES –
|
|-
| PRIVATE DANCER – Tina Turner
| TOP 100 POP ALBUMS –
|
| style="text-align:center;"|
|-
|| 1985
| WE DON’T NEED ANOTHER HERO (Thunderdome) – Tina Turner
| TOP 100 POP SINGLES –
|
| style="text-align:center;"|
|-
| rowspan="2"|1986
| TYPICAL MALE – Tina Turner
| TOP 100 POP SINGLES –
|
| style="text-align:center;"|
|-
| BREAK EVERY RULE – Tina Turner
| TOP 50 POP ALBUMS –
|
|style="text-align:center;|
|-
|| 1993
| I DON’T WANNA FIGHT – Tina Turner
| TOP 50 POP SINGLES –
|
|style="text-align:center;" rowspan="3"|
|-

Music & Media year-end awards
Music & Media year-end awards were based on statistics from the Eurochart Hot 100 Singles and European Top 100 Albums. The awards were handed to most successful artists in Europe. Turner has received 6 awards

!
|-
|-
|rowspan="5"| 1985
|rowspan="13"| Tina Turner
| Top Female Artist (Albums)
|
|rowspan="13"|
|-
| Top Female Artist (Singles)
|
|-
| Top 10 Artists (Albums) -
|
|-
| Top 10 Artists (Singles)-
|
|-
| Female Artist of the year -
|
|-
| rowspan="3"| 1986
| Top 10 Female Artists (Albums)
|
|-
| Top 10 Female Artists (Singles)
|
|-
| Euro clips of the year (Singles) -
|
|-
|rowspan="3"|1989
| Top 10 Female Artists (Albums)
|
|-
| Top 10 Female Artists (Singles)-
|
|-
| Euro clips of the year (Singles) -
|
|-
|| 1993
| Top Female Artists (Albums)-
|
|-
|| 1996
|Top Female Artists (Singles)-
|

Billboard's Year-End R&B Chart
Top R&B Hits of 1950–1969
From wsuonline (based on Year End R&B Chart summaries – probably The Billboard year-end issues) 
Turner with Ike, has been on the lists 2 times.

!
|-
|| 1960
| A FOOL IN LOVE - Ike & Tina Turner
| Top 5 R&B singles–
|
|style="text-align:center;" rowspan="2"|
|-
|| 1961
| It's Gonna Work Out Fine - Ike & Tina Turner
| Top 5 R&B singles–
|
|-

Chicago Tribune

!
|-
| rowspan="2"|1984
| Tina Turner
| R&B Performer of the Year
| 
|style="text-align:center;" rowspan="1"|
|-
| Tina Turner
| Rhythm and blues/soul artist honors
| 
|style="text-align:center;" rowspan="1"|
|-

Ebony Readers Poll

!
|-
| 1985
| Tina Turner
| The Honorees
| 
|style="text-align:center;" rowspan="1" |
|-
|1990
| Tina Turner
|The most Exciting Black Woman
|
|style="text-align:center;" rowspan="1" |
|-
|1992
| Tina Turner
| The woman most male readers would like to spend an evening with
|
|style="text-align:center;" rowspan="1" |
|-
|1994
| Tina Turner and Ike
| The best recent movie starring Blacks
|
|style="text-align:center;" rowspan="1" |
|-

BMI Awards
The BMI Awards are annual award ceremonies for songwriters in various genres organized by Broadcast Music, Inc., honoring songwriters and publishers. The main pop music award was founded in 1952.

|-
| 1994
| I Don't Wanna Fight
| The Most Performed Songs of the Year
| 
|-
| 2008
| What's Love Got to do with it
| Multi-Million Performance
| 
|-

The CLASSICS Act
The CLASSICS Act has been introduced by both chambers of Congress and
petition urging lawmakers to see it through.
The bill, which stands for Compensating Legacy Artists for their Songs, Service, & Important Contributions to Society Act—would close that loophole and require a uniform digital royalty rate for all music makes billions of dollars a year from airplay of music made before February 15, 1972. The letter, first introduced in December, was initially signed by more than 40 artists, including
Tina Turner.

|-
| 2018
| Herself
| Legacy Artists
| 
| style="text-align:center;"|
|-

NARM Music Awards
the National Association Of Record Merchandisers Gift Of Music Awards, now known as the Music Business Association

Walk of Fame Europe
In 1996, Turner's handprints at the Walk of Fame Europe Rotterdam.

|-
| 1996
| Herself
| handprints
| 
|-

Dressed Hall of Fame
Vanity Fair's International Best Dressed Hall of Fame – Females

|-
| 1996
| Herself
| Best Dressed Hall of Fame - Females
| 
|-

Women of the Year Award

|-
| 2005
| Herself
| Women of the Year Award
|

Recognitions, Career Achievements and Milestones
The Best Legs of All Time by Vogue (2018)
ranked No. 2 greatest female artist on VH-1's 100 Greatest Women in Rock & Roll list.
ranked No. 2 on The 15 Greatest Legs In The Music Biz by VH1.
ranked No. 2 on Top 5 Greatest Voices in the History of Rock Music.(2016) by ppcorn.com 
ranked No. 2 on Rolling Stone's "20 Greatest Duos of All Time"  (with Ike Turner).
ranked No. 4 on 11 Hair Icons of all time by Hype Hair   
ranked No. 9 on Sly Magazine's 10 Sexiest Women Over 40 [January 2006]
ranked No. 11 on Pollstar's Top 40 Grossing Tours of all-time in North America [Through 2003]  
ranked No. 34 on VH1’s 100 Greatest Artists Of All Time.
Ranked number sixty-one on the list of Rolling Stone's Immortals list.
ranked No. 26 on Rolling Stone's 50 Greatest Portraits 
ranked No. 6 on VH1's 100 Sexiest Artists of All Time.(2002)
ranked No. 6 on most loved singers in Switzerland.(2013) by The Swiss TV channel SRF 1.
ranked No. 2 on Pop's 20 greatest female artists by The Telegraph.
ranked No. 2 on 10 biggest musical comebacks of all time by Toronto Sun
ranked No. 19 by BET in the World's Top 25 Dancers of All Time.
ranked No. 11 The 25 Coolest Women  [1999] by The Advocate
ranked No. 22 on VH1's 50 Greatest Women Of The Video Era.
ranked No. 20 on The greatest singers ever by NME.COM 
ranked No. 22 on The 100 hottest female singers of all time by complex.com
ranked No. 23 on The 50 Hottest People of All Time  by papermag.com
ranked No. 29 on The 35 Greatest R&B Artists Of All Time by Billboard
ranked No. 33 on The Sexiest Woman Over 50 by zimbio.com
50 Most Beautiful People in the World (2000) by People Magazine  
25 Most Intriguing People [1984]     by People Magazine  
ranked No. 48 on THE TOP POP ARTISTS of the PAST 25 YEARS by THE ARC WEEKLY TOP 40 ARCHIVES 
ranked No. 51 on Top 100 artists by www.rockonthenet.com
ranked No. 80 on VH1's 100 Greatest Artists of Rock & Roll.
ranked No. 15 in Celebrity Sleuth 25 Sexiest Women of 1990 by Celebrity Skin (magazine)
ranked No. 33 on MetroNOW's Top 50 Gay Icons by MetroSource.
ranked No. 55 on The 75 Greatest Women of All Time by Esquire.
ranked No. 78 on USA Today Pop Candy's 100 People of the Year [2000]  
The oldest person to be on the front cover of Vogue.
World's most successful female rock artist ever. Record sales: over 60 million (1983–99)

References

Awards
Lists of awards received by American musician
Tina Turner